Zheltovodsky Makaryev Convent (formerly Monastery) of the Holy Trinity ( or Свя́то-Тро́ице-Мака́рьево-Желтово́дский же́нский монасты́рь) is one of the convents of the [Russian Orthodox Church]]. It is located in the vicinity of the urban-type settlement of Makaryevo in Lyskovsky District of Nizhny Novgorod Oblast.

History

Legendary foundation
The Makaryev (Makaryevsky) Convent was founded as a men's monastery. According to the legend, it was founded by the missionary Saint Macarius (Makary) in the early 15th century (1435, or, according to the Nizhny Novgorod Eparchy site, in 1415) by the waters of Zhyoltoye Ozero (Yellow Lake), from where comes the appellation "Zheltovodsky". 

In 1439, the monastery was burned by Tatar Khan Ulu Mukhammed. Macarius was taken prisoner but released by the Khan on the condition that he not rebuild the monastery. Macarius then went into the Kostroma forests, where he founded a new monastery on the Unzha River, now known as Unzhensky Makaryev monastery.

The monastery and the fair
In 1620, the monk Avramy (Abraham) from Murom came to this place to rebuild the monastery, and soon he was surrounded by other monks. In 1624, the first wooden Cathedral of the Holy Trinity was consecrated. 

Most of the existing major monastery buildings were constructed of stone between 1651 and 1667. The entire complex is surrounded by a fortress-like stone wall with towers, forming a square with each side being about 200 meters long. The notable buildings of the period include the (rebuilt) Cathedral of Holy Trinity (1658), the Church of the Dormition of Our Lady (the Uspensky Church) with the large attached refectory (trapeznaya) (1651), the bell tower (1651), the Church of St. Michael the Archangel above the southern gate, and the monastic cells. The refectory is a large (420 m²), two-storied building. 

The Church to St. Macarius was built in classical style in 1808. Eventually, the monastery had seven churches and one cathedral where the remains of St. Macarius were venerated. A well in the monastery was said to have been dug by St. Macarius himself. 

Despite the fortifications, the monastery was captured by Stenka Razin's rebel forces in 1670.

The famous Makaryev Fair took place every summer for over two centuries outside the monastery's walls. This was one of the most famous and important merchant fairs in Eastern Europe. Many merchants from Europe and Asia arrived in July to exchange goods. From the 1620s, the fair was essential to the Russian economy. By 1800, there were over three thousand government and private buildings to house the millions of rubles worth of trade goods. In 1816, a massive fire burned most buildings, and millions of rubles were lost. The fair was then (in 1817) moved to Nizhny Novgorod, where it became even more famous.

After the fire
After the fair moved to Nizhny Novgorod, the monastery lost its primary source of income, and monks started leaving. Besides, in the early 19th century, the Volga had shifted its course, absorbing the Yellow Lake. The monastery buildings were now threatened by the waters of the great river, with its annual spring floods. First, parts of the monastery walls fell due to erosion of the shore; in 1859, the cathedral's central dome was shattered. Concerned with the monks' security, the Nizhny Novgorod Eparchy (Orthodox Diocese) and the local authorities decided to abolish the monastery. In 1869, the monastic community was dissolved; a sole hieromonk remained as a caretaker of the deserted compound. The diocese transferred the icons, bells, and valuables to other churches. Only the Holy Icon of St. Macarius stayed in the monastery due to the pleadings of the residents of the adjacent town of Makaryev (currently, the urban-type settlement of Makaryevo). 

A few years later, the Volga shifted its course again and was now almost a kilometer away from the monastery buildings, no longer endangering them. In 1882, the old monastery was resurrected, now as a women's convent. In 1910, the central dome of the Trinity Cathedral was rebuilt and decorated with new paintings. By 1917, around three hundred nuns lived in the convent.

After the October Revolution, the Bolsheviks nationalized monastic properties. In 1927, the nuns were expelled from the convent. In 1928–1929, the buildings were used for an orphanage and later rented out to various institutions. A military hospital used the premises during World War II, and in 1943 they were transferred to the Lyskovo College of Animal Husbandry and Veterinary Medicine.

Modern condition

In January 1992, the Zheltovodsky Makaryev Convent of Holy Trinity was restored to the Nizhny Novgorod Orthodox Diocese. As of 2006, twenty-two nuns live there. The hegumenia (abbess) of the convent is Sister Mikhaila (Orlova).

On the occasion of the Feast of the Venerable Macarius in August 2007, the Saint's head was transferred to Makaryev Monastery from Nizhny Novgorod's Pechersky Ascension Monastery, where it had been previously kept.

The outside of the monastery features in the 2010 film Salt.

References
Nizhny Novgorod Eparchy site. "Active Monasteries". Accessed 22 Oct 2006. 
Alexander Serafimovich Gatsisky Makaryevo-Zheltovodsky Monastery (1434–1882) (Published around 1882)  
"Vozglas" newspaper. Accessed 20 Oct 2006. 
Makaryev Monastery: History and Culture. Accessed 20 Oct 2006. 
Feast of St. Macarius at Makariev Convent, August 8, 2006 (News item on the site of Pechersky Ascension Monastery; photos) 
Community Catalogue of Orthodox Christian Architecture: Makaryevo, Makaryevsky Zheltovodsky Monastery of Holy Trinity (photos)

External links 
 

Russian Orthodox monasteries in Russia
Buildings and structures in Nizhny Novgorod Oblast
1435 establishments in Europe
15th-century establishments in Russia
Cultural heritage monuments of federal significance in Nizhny Novgorod Oblast